Georges d'Esparbès (24 March 1863 - 25 June 1944) was a French novelist. Three film versions were made of his work Les demi-soldes, set during the Napoleonic era.

References

Bibliography 
 Klossner, Michael. The Europe of 1500-1815 on Film and Television: A Worldwide Filmography of Over 2550 Works, 1895 Through 2000. McFarland & Company, 2002.

External links 
 

1864 births
1944 deaths
French male novelists
People from Tarn-et-Garonne